Brittany Andrews is an American exotic dancer, pornographic actress, film producer and club DJ. In 2008, Andrews was inducted into the AVN Hall of Fame.

Career
Andrews worked in a Milwaukee beauty supply company before starting her career as an exotic dancer. After doing photo shoots for men's magazines, she began her career in adult films after meeting Jenna Jameson in 1995, during a photo shoot for Hustler magazine in Jamaica.
Andrews retired from porn in 2008. She returned to the business in 2010 to star in the adult film Sex and the City: A XXX Parody.

Advocacy
In December 2003, Andrews was appointed to the Women in Adult (WIA) board of directors as the Talent Liaison. She has promoted using a condom for hardcore sex scenes. Andrews has said that she is very politically active in the adult business and that her least enjoyable aspect of the business is standing by and watching the exploitation of women being coerced into performing without condoms.

Other ventures
Andrews has hosted programs on Playboy TV, including as co-producer on Talking Blue.
She started her own mainstream film production company Discipline Filmworks. In 2010, she produced and appeared in the short film Crumble. The film had its world premiere at the 2010 New York International Independent Film and Video Festival, where it won a number of awards including Audience Award for Short Film, Best Actor in a Short Film (for Steven Bauer) and Best Actress in a Short Film (Oksana Lada). She has also acted as executive producer for the film Trick of the Witch.

Awards and nominations 
2008 AVN Hall of Fame
2013 XBIZ Award nomination – Crossover Star of the Year
2022 AVN Award – Favorite Domme (Fan Award)
2023 AVN Award – Favorite Domme (Fan Award)

References

External links

 
 
 
 

Year of birth missing (living people)
American female erotic dancers
American pornographic film actresses
American pornographers
Women pornographic film directors
Living people
Actresses from Milwaukee
American women film producers
21st-century American women